Slavoljub "Slavko" Vorkapić (March 17, 1894 – October 20, 1976), known in English as Slavko Vorkapich, was a Serbian-born Hollywood montagist, an independent cinematic artist, chair of USC School of Cinematic Arts, chair of the Belgrade Film and Theatre Academy, painter, and illustrator. He was a prominent figure of modern cinematography and motion picture film art during the early and mid-20th century and was a cinema theorist and lecturer.

Early life

Slavoljub Vorkapić was born on March 17, 1894, in the small village of Dobrinci, near Ruma in the Srem region, at the time part of the Kingdom of Croatia and Slavonia, Austro-Hungarian Empire (now Vojvodina, Serbia). 

His father, Petar, the town clerk, insisted that young Slavko be well-educated. After finishing his primary education, he became a student in a well-known regional high-school in the nearby town of Sremska Mitrovica, where he made his first steps in art and drawing. (Mileva Marić-Einstein, the first wife and work associate of Albert Einstein attended the same high school.) 

He continued his high-school education in Zemun and later in the famous Art School in Belgrade. With a scholarship received from Matica srpska, Serbia's highest cultural and scientific institution at the time, Vorkapić went to Budapest, Hungary, where he studied art. At the beginning of World War I, he immediately returned to his homeland where, with the country besieged on all sides, he survived the tragic Serbian retreat across Albania in order to reach Allied positions in Greece. 

From there he sailed to Italy, from where he reached France. He managed to enter Art Academy in Paris but soon after moved to Montparnasse among other Avant-garde artists. He took part in the 1917 and 1919 collective painter exhibits.

Career

Slavko Vorkapich's dream to go to the United States was fulfilled in 1920. For a short time, he lived in New York City. Then, for almost a year, he roamed the country nearly homeless, until his arrival in Hollywood in July 1921. 

Although he started his motion picture career as a painter and an actor, he became best known as a montagist, special effects expert, cinematic artist, cinema teacher, editor, and became one of the most respected cinematic filmmakers in the period between the two World Wars. Vorkapić made a great number of cinematic documentaries and lyrical purely cinematic short-length movies. He co-wrote the screenplay for Johann the Coffinmaker (1927), a 27-minute experimental film directed by Robert Florey that involved a lot of trick photographic effects.

Vorkapić co-directed the experimental black and white short motion-picture The Life and Death of 9413: a Hollywood Extra (1928) with Robert Florey, and 2 beautiful and exciting visual tone poems, Moods of the Sea (1941) and Forest Murmurs (1947) with his Hollywood colleague, the Hungarian-born montagist and cinematic filmmaker John Hoffman (1904–1980).

His one-minute montage sequence for the otherwise lost movie Manhattan Cocktail (1928), directed by Dorothy Arzner, was released in the October 2005 DVD collection Unseen Cinema: Early American Avant Garde Film 1894-1941.

He is best known for his montage work (see montage sequence) on Hollywood movies such as Crime Without Passion (1934), Dr. Jekyll and Mr. Hyde (1941), Viva Villa! (1934), David Copperfield (1935), The Good Earth (1937), and Mr. Smith Goes to Washington (1939). Vorkapich used kinetic editing, lap dissolves, tracking shots, creative graphics and optical effects for his montage sequences for such features as Manhattan Melodrama (1934), Maytime, The Firefly (both 1937), and Meet John Doe (1941). He created, shot, and edited these kinesthetic montages for features at Universal Pictures, MGM, RKO, and Paramount. He directed a short documentary movie for RKO, Private Smith of the U.S.A., that was nominated for an Academy Award.

Vorkapich is credited for editing and montage on Moscow Strikes Back (1942), one of four winners at the 15th Academy Awards for Best Documentary Feature.

He was appointed chair of the Department of Film of the University of Southern California from 1949 to 1951.
During the 1950s, he was in Yugoslavia and worked as a professor at the Belgrade Film and Theatre Academy. In Yugoslavia in 1955, Vorkapić directed a full-length motion picture, Hanka.

Personal life
In 1938, Vorkapich commissioned modern architect Gregory Ain to build a garden house for his residence in Beverly Hills. It was a minor landmark in prefabricated architecture. It has since been destroyed.

Two of his many master drawings, his gift during a visit to Yugoslavia, are kept in the Srem Museum in Sremska Mitrovica.

Death

Slavko Vorkapić died of a heart attack in Mijas, Spain on the estate of his son Edvard who was a cinematographer on October 20, 1976, aged 82.

Influence and legacy
The now-common montage sequence often appeared as a notation in Hollywood screenplays of the 1930s and 40s as the "Vorkapich" because of his mastery of the dynamic visual montage sequence wherein time and space are compressed using a variety of cinematic techniques, such as kinetic montage, camera tricks, optical printer effects, dolly shots, & stylized graphics. Sometimes moviemakers will simply refer to the technique as "a Vorkapich".

Vorkapich's protege Art Clokey learned kinescope animation techniques under him at USC Film School and went on to use them to create the Gumby animated series.

Better Call Saul creator Peter Gould cited Vorkapich as a major influence for the montage sequence in the Season 1 finale titled "Marco".

See also

 Pure cinema
 Montage (filmmaking)
 Cinematic techniques
 Experimental film
 Abstract film

References

Sources
The Most Typical Avant-Garde. James, David – 2005
On True Cinema. Babac, Marko – 1998
Slavko Vorkapich: Reminiscences.  Davis, Ronald – 1978

External links
 
 
 Recreation of the life and death of 9413 at the Internet Archive
 Slavko Vorkapić at FilmReference.com
 Slavko Vorkapić picture circa 1950
 http://purecinema-celluloid.webs.com/slavkovorkapich.htm
 "The Furies," opening montage sequence of Crime Without Passion (1934)

1894 births
1976 deaths
People from Ruma
Austro-Hungarian emigrants to the United States
USC School of Cinematic Arts faculty
American film directors
American cinematographers
Serbian film directors
American university and college faculty deans
American film editors
20th-century American academics